The 1936–37 FAW Welsh Cup is the 56th season of the annual knockout tournament for competitive football teams in Wales.

Key
League name pointed after clubs name.
B&DL - Birmingham & District League
CCL - Cheshire County League
FL D2 - Football League Second Division
FL D3N - Football League Third Division North
FL D3S - Football League Third Division South
MWL - Mid-Wales Football League
SFL - Southern Football League
WLN - Welsh League North
WLS D1 - Welsh League South Division One
WLS D2E - Welsh League South Division Two East
WLS D2W - Welsh League South Division Two West
W&DL - Wrexham & District Amateur League

First round

Second round
18 winners from the First round plus Vron United and Ebbw Vale.

Third round
Ten winners from the Second round plus 20 new teams.

Fourth round
14 winners from the Third round. Barry get a bye to the Fifth round.

Fifth round
Five winners from the Fourth round plus Barry. Porth United and Llay Welfare get a bye to the Sixth round.

Sixth round
Three winners from the Fifth round, Porth United, Llay Welfare plus eleven new clubs.

Seventh round

Semifinal
Semifinal were held on a neutral venue: Rhyl and Newport County played at Shrewsbury, while Crewe Alexandra and Barry Town played at Cardiff.

Final
Both final and replay were held in Chester.

External links
The FAW Welsh Cup

1936-37
Wales
Cup